Adefunke Sharon Kasali is a Nigerian philanthropist and clergy. She was the Executive Secretary of Petroleum Equalisation Fund Management Board from 2007 to 2015. She is the founder of Diamond Lights Women Empowerment Initiative.

Education and Career 
She completed a Bachelor of Business Administration degree in Accounting from Texas Southern University and obtained a Master of Business Administration in Finance and MIS from the University of Houston Graduate School of Business in 1991. She is also a member of the Institute of Chartered Accountants of Nigeria (ICAN). She was appointed as the Executive Secretary of the Petroleum Equalization Fund Board from April 2007 till 2015.

Personal life 
She is married to Pastor Yomi Kasali and they have 2 children.

References 

Year of birth missing (living people)
Living people
Nigerian philanthropists